Aporosa cardiosperma is a species of plant in the family Phyllanthaceae. It is endemic to South-West Sri Lanka.

References

Flora of Sri Lanka
cardiosperma
Vulnerable plants
Taxonomy articles created by Polbot
Taxa named by Joseph Gaertner